Princess Louise of Saxe-Hildburghausen (Charlotte Luise Friederike Amalie Alexandrine; 28 January 1794 – 6 April 1825) was a member of the House of Saxe-Hildburghausen, and a Princess of Saxe-Hildburghausen by birth. Through her marriage to William, Duke of Nassau, Louise was also a member of the House of Nassau-Weilburg and duchess consort of Nassau. Louise was briefly princess consort of Nassau-Weilburg in 1816.

Family life and early years
Louise was the youngest daughter of Duke Frederick of Saxe-Hildburghausen and his wife, Duchess Charlotte Georgine of Mecklenburg-Strelitz. She thus belonged to the House of Sachsen-Hildburghausen. Louise and her sister Therese were both considered very beautiful, and were the subject of the poem “Mit drei Moosrosen,” written by Friedrich Rückert.

Marriage
In 1809, Ludwig, Crown Prince of Bavaria visited Schloss Hildburghausen to choose his bride. Ludwig chose between Louise and Therese, though soon selected Therese. Upon this, Louise was wed with William, Duke of Nassau, eldest son of Frederick William, Prince of Nassau-Weilburg and his wife, Burgravine Louise Isabelle of Kirchberg.

On 24 June 1813, in Weilburg, the two were married. To honour the occasion of their marriage, the Civil Guard of Weilberg, including Samuel Luja, composed the "Cantate am Feste der Heimführung des Erbprinzen Wilhelm von Nassau mit der Prinzessin Louise von Sachsen-Hildburghausen."

The marriage was an unhappy one: Louise's husband was not only autocratic in politics, but he was also rude to his family circle and pestered his wife and children.

Death, aftermath and legacy 
Louise died in 1825 shortly after the birth of her youngest daughter, Marie. Following her death, Louise's husband married her sister Charlotte's daughter Princess Pauline of Württemberg. The Luisenplatz and Luisenstraße in Wiesbaden are named for Louise.

Issue 
Louise and William had eight children:

 Auguste Luise Friederike Maximiliane Wilhelmine of Nassau (12 April 1814 - 3 October 1814).
 Therese Wilhelmine Friederike Isabelle Charlotte of Nassau (17 April 1815 - 8 December 1871); married in Biebrich, on 23 April 1837 to Duke Peter of Oldenburg. Their grandson was the tsarist general Grand Duke Nicholas Nikolaevich of Russia the Younger.
 Adolphe, Grand Duke of Luxembourg (24 July 1817 – 17 November 1905). The present Grand Ducal Family of Luxembourg, which became extinct in the male line in 1912, descends from him.
 Wilhelm Karl Heinrich Friedrich of Nassau (8 September 1819 - 22 April 1823).
 Moritz Wilhelm August Karl Heinrich of Nassau (21 November 1820 - 23 March 1850); died unmarried and without issue.
 Princess Marie of Nassau (29 January 1825 - 24 March 1902)

Ancestry

References

Literature 
Heinrich Ferdinand Schoeppl: Die Herzoge von Sachsen-Altenburg. Bozen 1917, Neudruck Altenburg 1992.
Dr. Rudolf Armin Human: Chronik der Stadt Hildburghausen. Hildburghausen 1886.

External links 

Royal My Origins | Princess Louise

1794 births
1825 deaths
House of Saxe-Hildburghausen
House of Nassau-Weilburg
People from Hildburghausen
People from Saxe-Hildburghausen
Princesses of Saxe-Hildburghausen
Princesses of Saxe-Altenburg
Burials in the Royal Crypt of Weilburg Schlosskirche
Daughters of monarchs